ECT (an abbreviation of Extra Celestial Transmission) is a British television music programme dedicated to hard rock and metal music genres.

Ten episodes were broadcast on Channel 4 between 12 April 1985 and 14 June 1985.

It aired on Friday evenings (17:30 to 18:10) as part of Channel 4's Friday Zone that also included Paintbox (18:10 to 18:20) and Soul Train (18:20 to 19:00).

It preceded two other UK TV programmes aimed at fans of rock and heavy metal: Power Hour (1988–90) and Raw Power (1990-93).

Recording 

The shows were recorded at Wembley Studios and produced by Keith MacMillan's Keefco production company. The series producer was Annie Russell.

Format 
Each artist played two or three songs live. In addition to the live bands, the show had its own dance troupe, Beauxartz, choreographed by Kevan Allen.

Episodes

The episodes were:

References

External links 
 AndyLeRock ECT blog

1980s British music television series
Rock music television series
Channel 4 original programming
1980s in British music
Heavy metal television series
1985 British television series debuts
1985 British television series endings